Late Nights Early Days is a live album by American new wave band Missing Persons, released in 1997. Identified as an "important document of '80s pop" by AllMusic reviewer Tom Schulte, the album features a 1981 live concert, as well as a previously unreleased studio track from 1980, entitled "Action Reaction".

Track listing
 "Action Reaction" - 2:52*
 "Mental Hopscotch" - 3:06
 "Noticeable Ones" - 3:35
 "Words" - 4:22
 "Destination Unknown" - 3:21
 "Here and Now" - 3:16
 "I Like Boys" - 2:54
 "Hello, I Love You" - 2:27
 "No Way Out" - 3:19
 "Windows" - 4:55
 "U.S. Drag" - 3:34
 "Walking in L.A." - 4:01

Personnel
 Dale Bozzio - lead vocals
 Terry Bozzio - drums, backing vocals
 Warren Cuccurullo - guitars, backing vocals
 Chuck Wild - keyboards
 Patrick O'Hearn - bass, synth bass

References

Missing Persons (band) albums
1997 live albums